Red Brick Church is a historic Baptist church located at Sodus Center in Wayne County, New York.  The former meeting house is a two-story, gable roofed rectangular brick building resting on a slightly raised fieldstone foundation. It was built in 1824–1826 to serve the areas first Baptist society and served as a house of worship until 1926. Also on the property is a burying ground with the earliest gravestone dating to 1809.

It was listed on the National Register of Historic Places in 1997.

References

Churches on the National Register of Historic Places in New York (state)
Baptist churches in New York (state)
Federal architecture in New York (state)
Churches completed in 1826
19th-century churches in the United States
Churches in Wayne County, New York
1826 establishments in New York (state)
National Register of Historic Places in Wayne County, New York